Oz is a trade paperback collecting comic stories based on the Buffy television series about the character Daniel "Oz" Osbourne.

This story is generally considered not part of the official Buffyverse canon.

Story synopsis
Oz left Sunnydale in search of his own nature, he travels to the Far East. Oz goes across the globe in search of a secret monastery where he might learn to find inner peace. When he arrives, he discovers that a number of the monks have been kidnapped by a demon-race. Oz must rescue the monks and overcome a terrible demon.

The story is set in Buffy season 4, after "Wild at Heart". Takes place after Blood of Carthage, and before Giles.

Publication

Issues

Trade paperback
The series was collected into a trade paperback published May 15, 2002, which included a sketchbook section featuring the work of cover artist John Totleben and series artist Logan Lubera.

Comics based on Buffy the Vampire Slayer
Werewolf comics
Comics set in Tibet
2001 comics debuts
2001 comics endings